Meeuwen-Gruitrode is a former municipality located in the Belgian province of Limburg. In 2021, Meeuwen-Gruitrode had a total population of 13,117. The total area is 91.31 km².

It also includes the hamlets of Muisven, Ophoven, Zoetebeek, Koestraat, and Plokrooi.

Effective 1 January 2019, Opglabbeek and Meeuwen-Gruitrode were merged into the new municipality of Oudsbergen.

References

External links
 

Oudsbergen
Former municipalities of Limburg (Belgium)